Michael Edward Scrutton (29 August 1945 – 26 December 2007) was an English cricketer. A right-arm medium-fast bowler, he played two Minor Counties Championship matches for Suffolk in 1964, before playing his only List A game against Kent in 1966, taking the wicket of future England Test player Mike Denness. He later played three matches for Singapore against Hong Kong between 1971 and 1974.

References

1945 births
2007 deaths
Cricketers from Liverpool
English cricketers
Singaporean cricketers
Suffolk cricketers
People from West Derby